The National Assembly (Majlisi milli) is the upper chamber of Tajikistan's bicameral parliament. It has 33 members : 25 elected for a five-year term by deputies of local majlisi and 8 appointed by the president. By right, former presidents are members for life. Rustam Emomali, who is the son of incumbent President Emomali Rahmon, is serving as the Chairman of the Majlisi Milli since April 17, 2020.

Twenty-five members were elected on March 27, 2020 and President Emomali Rahmon appointed one quarter of the members in April, bringing the total number of members to thirty-one.

Chairmen of Majlisi milli

References

Tajikistan
Government of Tajikistan
Tajikistan
1999 establishments in Tajikistan